Marcel Koning (born 14 January 1975) is a Dutch former footballer, who played as a midfielder, and current manager of RKVV Westlandia.

Playing career
Koning played for the Dutch professional football clubs ADO Den Haag, NEC and NAC Breda between 1992 and 2005.

Managerial career
In 2005, he joined HBS where he also managed the U19 and U19 teams of the club. In 2009, he joined ADO Den Haag as a youth coach. He was the manager of the U19 team in the 2011/12 season while he took charge of the U16's in the following season.

In 2013, he became manager of Feyenoord's U16 team which he was for two season, alongside a position as assistant manager for the senior reserve team in the 2014/15 season. In the 2015/16 season, he managed the club's U19 team.

In June 2016, he became manager of his former Derde Divisie club, HBS. In January 2019 it was confirmed, that Koning would take charge of RKVV Westlandia from the upcoming 2019/20 season.

References

1975 births
Living people
Footballers from The Hague
Dutch footballers
Association football midfielders
ADO Den Haag players
NEC Nijmegen players
NAC Breda players
Eerste Divisie players
Eredivisie players
Dutch football managers
HBS Craeyenhout football managers